Kevin James LaBrie (born May 5, 1963) is a Canadian singer, best known as the lead singer of American progressive metal band Dream Theater, which he has been fronting since 1991.

Early life
Kevin James LaBrie was born in Penetanguishene, Ontario, Canada and started playing drums at age five. By his mid-teens, he was a member of several bands as a front man that attempted singing and/or drumming. He stopped playing drums at age 17 and in 1981, at age 18, he moved to Toronto.

Career

Coney Hatch
LaBrie joined Coney Hatch in 1986 when they were attempting a new lineup. The band recorded a number of demonstration tapes in their rehearsal studio and performed live in Ontario clubs for several months. When their record company (Anthem) expressed their disapproval of the lineup, the band replaced LaBrie with Phil Naro in one last ditched attempt at forging ahead without Carl Dixon. That lineup was to be short lived as well.

Winter Rose
Soon after parting ways with Coney Hatch, LaBrie became the vocalist for the glam metal band Winter Rose.  The group also included Richard Chycki on guitar and bass, Randy Cooke on drums, and Sebastian Bach on vocals.  Chycki had also worked with Bach under the band names Sebastian and Hope. The band recorded a series of demos through 1988 and 1989 with guest musicians Bruce Dies and Rob Laidlaw. The tracks were commercially released in 1989 as a self-titled album by Inside Out Music. All the songs on the album were written by Richard Chycki and James LaBrie, except two which Richard Chycki wrote alone.

Dream Theater

In 1990, LaBrie learned that American progressive metal band Dream Theater was looking for a new singer, so he submitted a tape and was quickly flown to New York for a full audition. The tryout went well, and he was chosen ahead of 200 other hopefuls to fill the full-time vocalist position in that band.

LaBrie has since had a significant impact on the vocal melodies on each Dream Theater album, but until recently has had little input on the instrumentation of Dream Theater's music; 2011's A Dramatic Turn of Events features LaBrie in the music credits on three songs. To date he has written or co-written lyrics for at least one song on ten of the fifteen albums Dream Theater has released with him in the band, Images and Words, Black Clouds & Silver Linings, Dream Theater and The Astonishing containing none of them.

Asked by Prog-Sphere.com what is his favorite Dream Theater song to play live, James says "The favorite song for me is Scarred, I love performing that live. And... well, Octavarium, that whole freakin’ thing."

Solo
With Matt Guillory, LaBrie has released five solo albums under various names (Mullmuzzler, James LaBrie's Mullmuzzler, and simply James LaBrie).

In an interview from Beyond The Dark Horizon on June 12, 2010, James LaBrie stated that his next solo album entitled Static Impulse, is in the mixing stages and will contain 12 tracks. James stated "It's very heavy and I'm really excited."

On July 27, 2010 it was announced on Dream Theater's website that Static Impulse would be released on September 27, 2010 through Inside Out Music. It features longtime collaborator Matt Guillory on keyboards, Marco Sfogli (who also played on LaBrie's earlier album Elements of Persuasion) on guitars, Peter Wildoer of the Swedish melodic death metal band Darkane on drums and screaming vocals, and Ray Riendeau on bass.

James LaBrie stated "The release of Static Impulse is one that the whole band is psyched about. This is modern metal and as heavy and relevant as any other band out there going in a similar musical direction. There are riffs that will blow your head off and melodies both musically and vocally that are hypnotic. Get in the driver's seat and let the ears bleed. Enjoy and see you out there with a tour to follow up and support this release."

In 2011's interview for Prog-Sphere.com, LaBrie stated that the US tour got cancelled, saying "Because it was so disorganized last time. That's why I basically said, 'You don't have the visas yet. Where we're at this point, by the time you get the visas processed, we're gonna have one rehearsal and then we're gonna go out.' And I said, 'I'm not doing that.'"

In July 2013, LaBrie's album Impermanent Resonance was released by Inside Out Music.

Other projects
Throughout his career with Dream Theater, LaBrie has lent his voice to many other artists' records as well as tribute albums. In 1991, not long after joining Dream Theater (and before ever appearing on a Dream Theater recording), he sang background vocals on the song "Life in Still Water" on Fates Warning's Parallels album. He has appeared on many Trent Gardner releases (including Leonardo: The Absolute Man and Explorer's Club), as well as appearing on albums by such artists as Shadow Gallery, Tim Donahue and Frameshift.

LaBrie provided the lead vocals for the main character in the rock opera album The Human Equation by Ayreon; in 2015, he reprised his role for a live version, The Theater Equation. He was also featured as the character "The Historian" in the album The Source.

LaBrie is also a featured vocalist on Henning Pauly's "Babysteps" project released in 2006; LaBrie plays the role of the arrogant doctor.

Since 2004, LaBrie has been working with the True Symphonic Rockestra project, along with Thomas Dewald, Vladimir Grishko, Dirk Ulrich, Christoph Wansleben, Sandro Martinez, Paul Mayland, Marvin Philippi, and Igor Marin.
Their album, Concerto in True Minor - 3 Rock Tenors was released on iTunes and for download on Amazon on March 28, 2008, by Brainworx and Marinsound.

In 2016 LaBrie was the special guest on the Last Union debut album firstly meant to be named "Most Beautiful Day". He sang in three songs: "President Evil", "Taken" and "A Place In Heaven". Eventually the album was called "Twelve" and finally released on December 21, 2018. "Twelve" was written and pieced together over a -year period.

Personal life

LaBrie had said in many older interviews that he was Christian, and actively practiced the religion. However, in 2005 he revealed that he's since strayed from organized religion, and now considers himself "a more spiritual-directed person".

In an interview with Elizabeth Zharoff, LaBrie said he met his wife Karen in high school. As of 2022, they have been married for 33 years.

Singing

Influences
His musical influences comes from many different genres, including such artists as Sebastian Bach, Aerosmith, Don Dokken, Metallica, The Doors, Ludwig van Beethoven, Nat King Cole, Queen, Sting, and Muse whose inspiration, according to LaBrie, is shown on Dream Theater's album, Octavarium. LaBrie lists Freddie Mercury as his "all-time favorite" singer, and also admires such singers as Steve Perry, Lou Gramm, Rob Halford, Steven Tyler, Robert Plant, and Jeff Buckley, among others.

Reception
LaBrie is widely known for his lyric tenor style singing voice. He was voted by fans to #16 on MusicRadar's "The greatest vocalists of all time" in 2010. During his career with Dream Theater, LaBrie's singing voice has received both praise and criticism. In response to detractors of his vocal abilities, LaBrie has said, "These people are pathetic and need to move on. I say get a life and maybe work on making your life a better one instead of thinking the answer lies in cutting someone else up to raise your miserable spirit".

Food poisoning incident
On December 30, 1994, while vacationing in Cuba, LaBrie was stricken with a severe case of food poisoning from contaminated pork and while vomiting, he ruptured his vocal cords. He saw three throat specialists who all said there was nothing they could do except have him rest his voice as much as possible. However, on January 12, 1995, against doctor's orders, he was on the Waking Up the World Tour in Japan promoting Dream Theater's Awake album with his voice far from normal. LaBrie has said he did not feel vocally "normal" until at least 2002. He has also said that this era was a very hard time for him as a singer, and depression as a result caused him to consider departing from the band, although his bandmates supported him and urged him to stay. After the World Tourbulence tour, he discovered that his voice had fully returned. He said that his voice was fully healed by time and training. However, while speaking to Greg Prato of Songfacts in 2019, LaBrie explained how the incident affected his vocal range. "So, instead of hitting D's and E's and F-sharps and all that stuff, I was able to hit C, C-sharp, and D. But I had to really watch it. I have hit F notes here and there, but I have to really watch it. But that was probably the darkest moment in my life, for sure."

Lip syncing allegations
In February of 2022, rumors emerged of LaBrie lip syncing during the North American leg of Dream Theater's Top of the World Tour as fan recordings from the tour were posted online. Specifically, fans pointed to the post-chorus section of the song "Bridges In The Sky" as evidence of LaBrie lip syncing to a pre-recorded vocal track. LaBrie addressed the controversy onstage during the band's performance in Houston, Texas, on March 18, 2022, denying the allegations and claiming he has never lip synced in his entire life.

Discography
Winter Rose
Winter Rose (1989)

Dream Theater
 Images and Words (1992)
 Awake (1994)
 A Change of Seasons (1995)
 Falling into Infinity (1997)
 Metropolis Pt. 2: Scenes from a Memory (1999)
 Six Degrees of Inner Turbulence (2002)
 Train of Thought (2003)
 Octavarium (2005)
 Systematic Chaos (2007)
 Black Clouds & Silver Linings (2009)
 A Dramatic Turn of Events (2011)
 Dream Theater (2013)
 The Astonishing (2016)
 Distance over Time (2019)
 A View from the Top of the World (2021)

MullMuzzler
Keep It to Yourself (1999)
MullMuzzler 2 (2001)

Solo
Elements of Persuasion  (2005)
Static Impulse  (2010)
Impermanent Resonance (2013)
I Will Not Break (2014) (Compilation EP)
Beautiful Shade of Grey (2022)

Others
 Fates Warning - Parallels (1991)
 Explorers Club – Age of Impact (1998)
 Various Artists (A tribute to Rush) – Working Man – A Tribute to Rush (1996)
 Various Artists (A tribute to Queen) – Dragon Attack (1997)
 Shadow Gallery - Tyranny (1998)
 Various Artists (A tribute to Emerson, Lake & Palmer) – Encores, Legends & Paradox (1999)
 Explorers Club – Raising the Mammoth (2002)
 Frameshift - Unweaving the Rainbow (2003)
 Tim Donahue - Madmen & Sinners (2004)
 Ayreon - The Human Equation (2004)
 Henning Pauly - Babysteps (2006)
 John Macaluso & Union Radio - The Radio Waves Goodbye (2007)
 True Symphonic Rockestra - Concerto in True Minor (2008)
 Redemption - Snowfall on Judgment Day (2009)
 Roswell Six - Terra Incognita: Beyond The Horizon (2009)
 Eden's Curse - Trinity (2011)
 Rik Emmett & RESolution9 - RES9 (2016)
 Ayreon - The Source (2017)
 Last Union - Twelve (2018)
 Jordan Rudess - Wired for Madness (2019)
 Symphony North - The Bell Ringer (2019)
 Evergrey - Escape of the Phoenix (2021)
 Timo Tolkki's Avalon - The Enigma Birth'' (2021)

References

External links

 James LaBrie official website
 2011 interview with James LaBrie on Prog Sphere

Dream Theater members
1963 births
Living people
20th-century Canadian male singers
Canadian rock singers
Canadian heavy metal singers
Canadian tenors
People from Penetanguishene
Musicians from Ontario
Explorers Club (band) members
Inside Out Music artists
Roadrunner Records artists
21st-century Canadian male singers
Coney Hatch members